Hampton College, a South African college, was established in 1985. It is situated in Durban and is a private school.

References

Educational institutions established in 1985
1985 establishments in South Africa